Gao Yisheng (1866–1951) was the creator of the Gao style of the Chinese Internal Martial Art of Baguazhang. His life bridged the second generation and third generation of Bagua practitioners into the 20th century. He was one of the few third generation Bagua practitioners to live beyond the 1940s. His innovation and impact on Bagua as a fighting art cannot be underestimated.

Life
Gao Yisheng was born in Da Zhuang Zi Village, Da Shan Township, Wu Di County, Shandong province, China in 1866. During his childhood his family fortune was lost so they moved to Wu Ching County, Shaogao township in Hebei province to find employment. When he was young his leg was broken by a mule cart and the bone was set incorrectly so Gao walked with a cane the rest of his life. As a boy he learned the art of Da Hong Quan (Big Red Fist) in his home village.

In 1892 when Gao was twenty-six years old he began his study of Baguazhang with Dong Haichuan’s student Sung Zhangjun (Song Changrong). After three years of practice with Song all he had learned was basic circle walking and the single palm change. Gao asked for more instruction, but Song refused and Gao left to find another teacher.

At age thirty, in 1896, Gao met Zhou Yuxiang. Zhou was a talented student of Cheng Tinghua. Zhou’s skill in fighting had earned him the nickname “Peerless Palm” Zhou. Gao and Zhou “crossed hands” three times and Gao was defeated each time. Gao knelt and asked to become Zhou's disciple. Zhou said they were too close in age for him to bring him into the system so Zhou took Gao to Beijing to meet his teacher Cheng Tinghua. Cheng accepted him as his student because of his previous experience with Sung and on Zhou Yuxiang's recommendation. Gao learned the majority of the system from Zhou and would travel to Beijing periodically to study with Cheng, until Cheng's death four years later. Gao learned the eight xian tian palms, weapons forms and applications.

After six years of intense study Gao began teaching Cheng Tinghua Style Ba Gua Zhang in Shao-gao township, Wu Ching County, Hebei province. Some time between 1902 and 1911 Gao also studied Xingyiquan with Li Cunyi. In 1911 he returned to his home village Shandong province at the age of forty – five at which time he started teaching his Gao style Baguazhang.

Around 1912 Gao claimed he met Song Yiren, a Taoist from Guang Hua Mountain who gave him the Hou Tian sets. It is likely that this is a fabrication because the Chinese attribute many of their martial arts to famous yet obscure sources. Even his direct students expressed doubts about this story. There are many Baguazhang systems with application based short forms similar to Gao's Hou Tian Sets. It is not difficult to imagine that Gao had learned some of them from Cheng or Zhou. Another student of Zhou Yuxiang wrote a book that had 31 of Gao's 64 Hou Tien palms in it. Han Muxia, grand-student of Cheng Tinghua and friend of Zhou Yuxiang's had 48 straight line Baguazhang sets almost identical to Gao's. Based on the above facts, it is possible that Gao may have standardized 48 of the Hou Tians from his experience with Zhou, Cheng and Li Cunyi then rounded out the total number to 64 in accordance with well-known Daoist cosmology.

Between 1911 and 1917, Gao moved to Yang village, Wu Ching County, Hebei province, about ten miles from Tianjin city. He taught in Yang village and in Tianjin city. Gao would also periodically return to his home village in Da Shan Township in Shandong province to teach. Tianjin was a rough and violent place with many experienced martial artists, gangsters and coarse people. Anyone who taught martial arts in Tianjin City had to have real fighting skill.

Gao's main source of income was teaching martial arts classes so his class structure was designed to teach anyone who wanted to learn. His public classes contained multiple levels, each level of study costing more money; some students only wanted to learn Baguazhang for health, others for show, some could not afford to learn more than what was taught in the basic class and still others wanted fighting skill. He trained his students according to their interests, attitude, and physical condition.

In 1942 he fought with a Taijiquan teacher in the park. Gao defeated him but injured him so badly he died three days later. To avoid the police Gao fled to Wu Ching village outside Tianjin city. He never returned to Tianjin and spent his remaining years living in the back of a Chinese medicine shop; he died in 1951 at the age of eighty-five.

Lineages
During his 40+ years of teaching Baguazhang Gao Yisheng's skill grew and developed. Accordingly, his Baguazhang changed and developed as well. During his long teaching career, he had hundreds if not thousands of students. These students and schools show the progression of Gao as a martial artist. This does not mean that one lineage is better than another. What it does show is that Gao had a deep understanding of the principles of Baguazhang throughout his long career and all these schools are representative of Gao Yisheng's teaching and philosophy.

Today, there many schools and teachers that have descended from his lineage. There are many other schools not listed here. The main branches of his lineage come from Tianjin city, China, Taipei, Taiwan (there are two separate lineages there) and Hong Kong, China.

Tianjin City: Liu Fengcai was Gao's nephew and studied with him in Shandong and followed him to Tianjin city when he moved there. He taught classes for Gao and was known for his skill in the Xian Tian (pre-heaven) palms.

In Taipei, Taiwan the older lineage comes from Wu Jin-Yuan and his son Wu Huai-Shan. Both of these men studied with Gao early on when he was teaching in Shandong province. It is possible that Wu Jin-Yuan, who was already an accomplished martial artist, helped Gao develop some of the Hou Tian sets. Wu Jin-Yuan was Gao's first disciple. The family fled to Taiwan during the communist revolution in 1949.

The other lineage from Taipei, Taiwan comes from Zhang Junfeng. Zhang was a private student of Gao during his years in the city of Tianjin, China. He became Chairman of the Tianjin City Martial Arts Association and was known for his fighting skill. Gao gave his lineage the name "Yi Zong". He fled to Taipei, Taiwan during the Communist takeover of 1949.

The Hong Kong branch of Gao's art comes from He Kecai A.K.A Ho Ho Choi. Ho was a student of Gao's who was small in stature and had to work very hard against the larger students, thereby learning a great deal in the process. Gao gave this branch the lineage name "Dao Zong", but the name is rarely used.

In addition to these more well-known branches, there is also a branch of Gao style Baguazhang called "Zhe Zong" which traces its teaching from Gao's well-known student Wu Mengxia. According to both Zhang Jun Feng and He Kecai, Wu Mengxia was their senior brother under Gao Yisheng and shared much information on Gao Bagua theory with them. This branch survived quietly via the Bi family in Beijing after Wu Mengxia was imprisoned during the Communist assumption of power.

The Gao Style System
The Gao style system is referred to as the Gao Yisheng branch of the Cheng Tinghua system of Baguazhang. Essentially Gao Style Baguazhang is a unique subsystem. The Gao style system, because of Gao's own martial progression over time, can be found to have a number of different permutations, represented in various lineages. All are valid examples of Gao Style Baguazhang because they all represent Gao Yisheng's progression as a martial artist. Not all of the lineages have all of the levels. Gao was refining and creating sets until he died. He changed his straight line, pre-heaven and weapons sets more than once in his life, but at its core it is a complete Baguazhang system.

Gao's Bagua Zhang as listed in his book:

 Basic Exercises (Start posture, standing postures, Tang Ni Bu, Wu Xing Bu, eight Basic Stretches
 Basic Forms - Turning Forms (static palms)
 Xian Tian - Changing Forms (8 Big Palms)
 Dan Huan Zhang and Wu Lung Bai Wei (Beginning and Ending Palms)
 Hou Tian 64 Palms
 12 animals
 Push Hands and Attack & Defense
 Weapons Forms

The 哲宗 Zhe Zong and Yi Zong branches of Gao style Bagua will refer to their art as "Guanghua Bagua", which refers to Guanghua Mountain, from whence hailed the legendary Daoist teacher Song Yiren (who Gao claimed to have learned his Hou Tian 64 palms from). This is the preferred terminology and oral history among the Wu Mengxia and Zhang Junfeng branches.

Guanghua Baguazhang as practiced in the Wu Mengxia line consists of 108 "major exercises".. a number with numerological and cosmological significance (108 beads on a mala, 108 stars in Zi Wei Dou Shu 紫微斗數).

4 Main Divisions: Ben 本, Jie 解, Cai 拆, Bian 变.
 practices in Xian Tian (pre-heaven) for building up the body is Ben.
 Practices in Hou Tian (post- heaven) is for applications & fighting techniques is Jie.
 Practices in two person sets is Cai,
 Practices for free sparring using the Bagua once learned is Bian.

The Xian Tian section of the art includes:
 four postures training( stand, walk, leaning, lay down)
Single palm change (Dan Huan Zhang)
 Eight Big changes (Ba Mu Zhang), which are divided into four animal changes and four body changes
 Wulongbaiwei or five Dragons Changes (also called five dragons wave tails)
Guanghua Bagua in the Wu Mengxia line does not have the eight "static" or neigung palms found in many Cheng family Bagua styles).

The Hou Tian section of the art includes:
 10 Tian Gan (Ten Heavenly Stems - developmental and power training exercises)
 64 Houtian Palms - tactical fighting movements
 12 Di Zhi (12 Animal forms - which are different than Xingyiquan's 12 animals)
 eight Tang Chan Zhang (eight sticky palms)

Additionally there are also has 108 classic songs for the system to complement the 108 major movements.

Significant amounts of theory, such as the Eight Powers (Ba Gang), Three Basins (upright, slanting, flat) and the Five Elements for each basin are also included in the Wu Mengxia line (and other lines may contain these elements also).

See also
Neijia
Neigong
Neijin
Chinese martial arts

References

 Miller, Dan. Pa Kua Journal 3.5, July/Aug 1993.
 Miller, Dan. Pa Kua Journal 4.2, Jan/Feb 1994.
 Miller, Dan. Pa Kua Journal 6.5, July/Aug 1996.

External links
Yi Zong Bagua in Boulder, Colorado, USA
Info and history of Yi Zong Gao Bagua
The smaller Gao lineage from Taiwan
Tianjin, Gao bagua events in the U.S.
The home of Gao Bagua in Hong Kong
Tim Cartmell claims lineage under Luo Dexiu
 Zhe Zong School of Guanghua Gao Style Baguazhang  广华哲宗同易派 

1866 births
1951 deaths
Chinese baguazhang practitioners
Martial arts school founders
People from Binzhou
Sportspeople from Shandong